UAAP Football season 70 started with the tournament host Ateneo de Manila University playing against 2004 men's Football finalist University of the Philippines. The defending champions in the men's and women's divisions were University of Santo Tomas and Far Eastern University, respectively. This year marks the introduction of high school football in the UAAP as a demonstration sport. The initial participating schools are Ateneo de Manila University, De La Salle-Santiago Zobel School, University of Santo Tomas High School and FEU - Diliman.

Men's tournament

Elimination round

Women's tournament

Elimination round

Juniors' Football

Current Standings

70 football
UAAP Season 70